Spachea elegans is a species of flowering plants in the family Malpighiaceae. It is found in Brazil and Venezuela.

References

External links 
 Spachea elegans at The Plant List
 Spachea elegans at Tropicos

Malpighiaceae
Plants described in 1837
Flora of Brazil
Flora of Venezuela